Kebede Balcha (7 September 1951 – 10 July 2018) was a marathon runner from Ethiopia. He won the silver medal at the 1983 World Championships. He is the current record holder for the Montreal International Marathon with 2 hours 10 minutes 3 seconds in 1983. In 1999, he sought asylum in Toronto, where he lived until his death in 2018.

International competitions

Road races

References

External links

Montreal International Marathon

1951 births
2018 deaths
Ethiopian male long-distance runners
Ethiopian male marathon runners
Olympic athletes of Ethiopia
Athletes (track and field) at the 1980 Summer Olympics
World Athletics Championships athletes for Ethiopia
World Athletics Championships medalists
African Games bronze medalists for Ethiopia
African Games medalists in athletics (track and field)
Athletes (track and field) at the 1987 All-Africa Games